Kaeng Krachan National Park is the largest national park of Thailand. It is on the border with Burma, contiguous with the Tanintharyi Nature Reserve. It is a popular park owing to its proximity to the tourist town of Hua Hin. It was named a UNESCO World Heritage Site on 26 July 2021, despite concerns from the OHCHR around the human rights violations of the indigenous people that live in the park.

Geography

The park covers parts of the districts Nong Ya Plong, Kaeng Krachan, and Tha Yang of Phetchaburi Province, and of Hua Hin of Prachuap Khiri Khan Province. It consists mainly of rain forest on the eastern slope of the Tenasserim Mountain Range. The highest elevation in the park is 1,513 meters, in a "joint area of Thailand and Myanmar". The second highest mountain peak is Kao Panern Toong with an elevation of 1,207 m. Two main rivers originate within the park area, the Pranburi River and the Phetchaburi River. The Phetchaburi is impounded by the Kaeng Krachan Dam at the eastern border of the park. The dam creates a lake covering an area of 46.5 km2. The dam was built in 1966.

History
The park was declared a reserve in 1964 and on 12 June 1981 it became the 28th national park of Thailand. Originally covering an area of 1,548,750 rai ~ , it was enlarged in December 1984 to include the boundary area between Phetchaburi and Prachuap Khiri Khan Provinces, an additional 273,125 rai ~ . The park has been included on the list of ASEAN Heritage Parks. It is part of the Kaeng Krachan Forest Complex, which the Thai government had repeatedly nominated for designation as a World Heritage Site since 2011. At its 2019 meeting, UNESCO's World Heritage Committee (WHC) rejected Thailand's third bid, citing outdated information regarding boundaries and a lack of local community participation. In July 2021 Thailand made its fourth application for World Heritage Site recognition. On 26 July 2021, the 21 nations of the UNESCO World Heritage Committee voted 12–9 to approve Kaeng Krachan's listing as a World Heritage Site.

The killing of wild elephants is an ongoing problem at the park, with authorities unable to control poachers. Some park officials are allegedly involved in the trade of elephant parts.

Despite national park status, there are private plantations within the confines of Kaeng Krachan National Park. Some of these are surrounded by electric fences which, in June 2013, fatally electrocuted an elephant calf.

In 2018, the park started taking bids on a project to pave 18.5 kilometres of the Bang Krang to Phanoen Thung Road. It is budgeted at 87.62 million baht. The existing one-lane dirt road is "broken beyond repair" according to the park's chief. Environmentalists oppose the project on the grounds that easier accessibility will mean more tourists in the fragile ecosystem. The park chief says, "...the project does not violate regulations...and [we have] a duty...to proceed with the project." The project was halted, at least temporarily, in early-November 2018 by the National Parks Department to allow opponents to be heard on the issue.

Flora and fauna
The forests contain a great biodiversity of tropical vegetation, including tropical and subtropical broad leaf tree species and palms. Ninety-one species of mammals and 461 bird species have been counted in the park.

Wild fruits
The following wild fruits are found in Kaeng Krachan National Park.

Abutilon hirtum
Actephila excetsa
Actephita ovatis
Adenanthera pavonina
Afgekia filipes
Aglaia edulis
Aglaia lawii
Aglaia odoratissima
Aglaonema ovatum
Alangium kurzii
Aistonia rostrata
Amalocalyx microlobus
Ampelocissus martinii
Antheroporum glaucum
Antidesma ghaesembilla
Aporosa villosa
Archidendron jiringa
Argyreia roseopurpurea
Artabotrys burmanicus
Artocarpus lacucha
Aspidopterys tomentosa
Balakata baccata
Bauhinia ornata
Beilschmiedia glauca
Benkara sinensis
Breynia retusa
Bridelia insulana
Buxus cochinchinensis
Byttneria andamanensis
Calamus longlsetus
Capparis zeylanica
Castanopsis armata
Castanopsis echidnocarpa
Catunaregam spathulifolia
Catunaregam tomentosa
Ceriscoides mamillata
Cleistanthus hirsutulus
Clerodendrum glandulosum
Clerodendrum infortunatum
Cnestis palala
Codonopsis lancifolia
Colona auricutata
Croton caudatus
Dichapetalum longipetalum
Dillenia indica
Diospyros apiculata
Diospyros glandulosa
Diospyros rhodocalyx
Diospyros rubra
Dipterocarpus turbinatus
Dissochaeta divaricata
Dysoxylum cyrtobotryum
Elaeagnus latifolia
Elaeocarpus griffithii
Ellipeiopsis cherrevensis
Euonymus javanicus
Ficus annulata
Ficus capillipes
Ficus chatacea
Ficus fistuiosa
Ficus hirta
Ficus subpisocarpa
Ficus triloba
Flacourtia indica
Flacourtia rukam
Gardenia coronaria
Garuga pinnata
Geisemium elegans
Gironniera subequalis
Gtochidion obscurum
Gtycosmis puberula
Gymnema griffithii
Harpullia cupanioides
Hunteria zeylanica
Hydnocarpus ilicifolia
Hymenopyramis brachiata
Ilex umbellulata
Illigera trifotiata
Iodes cirrhosa
Jasminum harmandianum
Knema tenuinervia
Leptopus diplospermus
Litchi chinensis
Lithocarpus macphailii
Lithocarpus trachycarpus
Litsea glutinosa
Litsea ochracea
Mallotus barbatus
Mallotus philippensis
Mallotus subpeltatus
Mammea siamensis
Melastoma malabathricum
Melientha suavis
Micromelum falcatum
Mitrephora keithii
Mitrephora winitii
Momordica charantia
Momordica cochinchinensis
Murraya sp.
Neuropeitis racemosa
Passiflora foetida
Passiflora siamica
Payena lanceolata
Phrynium pubinerve
Phyllanthus collinsiae
Picrasma javanica
Pimelodendron griffithianum
Plectocomiopsis geminiflora
Polyalthia simiarum
Pomatocalpa maculosum
Premna serratifolia
Pseuduvaria rugosa
Reevesia pubescens
Rhodoleia championii
Rinorea bengalensis
Rothmannia sp.
Sapindus trifoliatus
Sauropus androgynus
Schleichera oleosa
Sindechites chinensis
Siphonodon celastrineus
Solanum erianthum
Spondias pinnata
Stephania pierrei
Sterculia lanceolata
Stereospermum colais
Sumbaviopsis albicans
Suregada multiflora
Swintonia floribunda
Syzygium gratum
Syzygium polyanthum
Tabernaemontana pandacaqui
Terminatia alata
Tetrastigma leucostaphyllum
Tinospora sinensis
Triadica cochinchinensis
Turraea pubescens
Uncaria cordata
Uvaria rufa
Viscum indosinense
Vitex scabra
Willughbeia edulis
Wrightia arborea
Xerospermum noronhianum
Ziziphus calophylla

See also
Wildlife of Thailand
Indochina
List of national parks of Thailand
List of Protected Areas Regional Offices of Thailand

References

External links

Kaeng Krachan National Park at Department of National Parks, Wildlife and Plant Conservation (archived 8 May 2016)
Wildlife, attractions and maps of Kaeng Krachan National Park
Thai birding: Kaeng Krachan National Park

National parks of Thailand
Protected areas established in 1981
Tenasserim Hills
Geography of Phetchaburi province
Tourist attractions in Phetchaburi province
Geography of Prachuap Khiri Khan province
Tourist attractions in Prachuap Khiri Khan province
1981 establishments in Thailand
ASEAN heritage parks
 World Heritage Sites in Thailand